The River Glaven in the eastern English county of Norfolk is  long and flows through picturesque North Norfolk countryside to the North Sea. Rising from a tiny headwater in Bodham the river starts  miles before Selbrigg Pond where three small streams combine. The scenic value of the Glaven valley is important to the tourist industry in North Norfolk. The river is one of over 200 chalk rivers in the world and one of 160 in the UK.

Geography
The river has a catchment area of approximately 115 km2 and from its source falls 50 metres to the present tidal limit at Cley sluice The sub-surface geology is predominantly chalk and in parts of the lower valley the river runs over chalk beds. The land adjoining the river consists of a mixture of arable farm land and, in the upper reaches near Edgefield, coniferous plantations. In the middle reaches there are grazing meadows and low-lying washlands especially below Glandford Mill. The Glaven has two major tributaries: Stody Beck joins just above Hunworth Mill (Map Ref TG 066 356), and the Thornage Beck joins close to the unbridged ford on the Thornage to Hunworth road (Map Ref TG 062 363).

Lakes and pools
There are three "on-stream" lakes associated with the main channel, these being Hawksmere (Hempstead mill pond), Edgefield Hall Lake and Bayfield Hall Lake. The long, thin lake at Bayfield Hall in many ways epitomises the beauty of the lower Glaven valley. It was dug in the late eighteenth century for ornamental purposes. In the late 19th century an "extravaganza" tunnel was built into the valley side so that the Glaven could be partly diverted around the lake.

This tunnel stopped operating in 2010 when the Bayfield hall project set out to create a new 1.2-mile long river channel to save the wildlife including many species of fish, especially Trout. The project was completed in 2014. It was very successful and this is the longest manmade river stretch in the UK.

Watermills
At the time of the Domesday Book the River Glaven had 19 watermills. Today the Glaven has six: in order of river descent they are Hempstead, Hunworth, Thornage, Letheringsett, Letheringsett Brewery mill and Glandford. Letheringsett mill is still in use and is the only working watermill in Norfolk, grinding corn to make flour which is on sale at the mill shop.

Wildlife
Water voles are present in the Glaven, in good numbers. Otters are difficult to see, but they make good use of the river. This could be one reason why mink are absent as otters are thought not to tolerate them. Both red deer and roe deer are seen.

The bird population reflects the range of habitats available, and the total number of species present is around 126, of which 68 have bred (these figures do not include birds of the coastal wetlands north of the coast road (A 149) at Cley). Birds seen locally include kingfisher, barn owl, common buzzard and osprey. The last uses the Glaven Valley as a flyway on its spring and autumn migration and it also sometimes stays to fish. Common buzzard breed in small but increasing numbers and can be seen wheeling overhead. Barn owls frequently hunt during daylight hours. As winter approaches flocks of pink-footed geese and brent geese fly from the coast to feeding grounds on the farms inland.

Fish
Fish in the river include three-spined stickleback, bullhead, stone loach, brown trout, sea trout, brook lamprey, roach, rudd, perch, eel, pike, gudgeon, carp and tench.

Insects and dragonflies

Some insects and dragonfly to be seen on the river include banded demoiselle, emerald damselfly, scarce emerald damselfly, large red damselfly, red-eyed damselfly, small red-eyed damselfly, azure damselfly, common blue damselfly, blue-tailed damselfly, migrant hawker, southern hawker, brown hawker, emperor dragonfly, four-spotted chaser, broad-bodied chaser, black-tailed skimmer, keeled skimmer, common darter, ruddy darter, common hawker, Norfolk hawker, hairy dragonfly, red-veined darter, yellow-winged darter, black darter and the variable damselfly.

Small mammals

Small mammals seen in or near the river include hedgehog, mole, common shrew, pygmy shrew, water shrew, noctule bat, pipistrelle bat, Natterer's bat, Daubenton's bat, rabbits, brown hares, grey squirrel, bank vole, short-tailed field vole, water vole, wood mouse, house mouse and the brown rat.

Larger mammals
Red deer, roe deer, muntjac, red fox, badger, otter, stoat, weasel and feral cats.

Gallery

References

External links
River Glaven Conservation Group
Letheringsett watermill 1
Letheringsett watermill 2
 River restoration project at Glandford Mill

Glaven, River